Ringgold is a city in and the county seat of Catoosa County, Georgia, United States. Its population was 3,414 at the 2020 census. It is part of the Chattanooga, Tennessee–GA Metropolitan Statistical Area.

History
Ringgold was founded in 1846 and incorporated as a city in 1847. It was named after Samuel Ringgold, a hero of the Battle of Palo Alto in the Mexican–American War.

Ringgold is where The General locomotive stopped during the Great Locomotive Chase on April 12, 1862. Ringgold is also home to the historic Ringgold Depot, which still contains bullet marks from the Civil War.

The Battle of Ringgold Gap took place on November 27, 1863. Confederate Major General Patrick Cleburne with 4,100 men used the mountain pass known as the Ringgold Gap to stall the advance of Union Major General Joseph Hooker and his troops. Hooker's troops were over 12,000 strong. It was a Confederate victory because it allowed Confederate artillery and wagon trains to move safely through the Ringgold Gap unharmed while inflicting high Union casualties.

On March 14, 2002, a sudden heavy fog played havoc with morning traffic and contributed to one of the worst traffic pileups in history; 125 vehicles crashed on Interstate 75 North and four people died.

Tornado

On April 27, 2011, an EF4 tornado touched down in Ringgold and Catoosa County, leaving a path of destruction. The tornado killed twenty people along a  path across Catoosa County and over the state line in Hamilton and Bradley counties. Eight died in Ringgold, including an entire family of four, and at least thirty others were injured. Many homes, businesses, and schools were damaged or destroyed.

Geography
Ringgold is located near the center of Catoosa County at  (34.917170, -85.115698). U.S. Routes 41 and 76 pass through the center of town as Nashville Street, leading northwest  to downtown Chattanooga, Tennessee, and southeast  to Dalton, Georgia. Interstate 75 passes through the southern part of the city with access from 348; the highway leads northwest to Chattanooga and southeast  to Atlanta.

Topography
Ringgold is situated in the Valley and Ridge geologic province of the Appalachian Mountains, characterized by long north-northeasterly trending ridges separated by valleys. The topography was formed by the erosion of alternating layers of hard and soft sedimentary rock that were folded and faulted during the building of the Appalachians. Taylor Ridge runs through Ringgold; a gap in the ridge is located just east of the city center, with the part of the ridge running to the south called Taylors Ridge and to the north called White Oak Mountain. South Chickamauga Creek, a tributary of the Tennessee River, runs through Ringgold.

Climate
The climate in this area is characterized by relatively high temperatures and evenly distributed precipitation throughout the year. According to the Köppen Climate Classification system, Ringgold has a humid subtropical climate, abbreviated "Cfa" on climate maps.

Demographics

2020 census

As of the 2020 United States census, there were 3,414 people, 1,565 households, and 878 families residing in the city.

2000 census
At the 2000 census, there were 2,422 people, 1,033 households and 644 families residing in the city. The racial makeup of the city was 91.33% White, 6.32% African American, 0.25% Native American, 0.50% Asian, 0.58% from other races, and 1.03% from two or more races. Hispanic or Latino of any race were 1.82% of the population.

There were 1,033 households, of which 30.3% had children under the age of 18 living with them, 41.6% were married couples living together, 17.1% had a female householder with no husband present, and 37.6% were non-families. 32.5% of all households were made up of individuals, and 13.5% had someone living alone who was 65 years of age or older. The average household size was 2.25 and the average family size was 2.85.

23.9% of the population were under the age of 18, 11.6% from 18 to 24, 29.8% from 25 to 44, 19.8% from 45 to 64, and 14.9% who were 65 years of age or older. The median age was 34 years. For every 100 females, there were 88.9 males. For every 100 females age 18 and over, there were 86.7 males.

The median household income was $26,834 and the median family income was $35,132. Males had a median income of $26,943 compared with $21,074 for females. The per capita income was $15,612. About 14.5% of families and 16.7% of the population were below the poverty line, including 26.1% of those under age 18 and 6.4% of those age 65 or over.

Education

Catoosa County Public Schools
The Catoosa County Public Schools educates students from pre-school to grade twelve. In the district, there are ten elementary schools, three middle schools, and three high schools. The district has 606 full-time teachers and over 9,809 students.

In 1954 the Ringgold Elementary School was destroyed in a fire.

Notable people
 Logan Baldwin, professional baseball player
Edgar William Brown, Sr. (1859–1917) physician turned successful businessman in Texas lumber and oil industry, born in Ringgold
 Austin Davis, professional football player, coach, born in Ringgold
 David Dreyer, American politician
 Stacey Evans, American politician
 Randall Franks American film and TV actor, entertainer, author 
 Roy Hawes (1926-2017), professional baseball player, died in Ringgold
 Dewayne Hill, American politician
 Hugh Hill, (1879–1958), professional baseball blayer, born in Ringgold
 Barbara Leigh (born 1946), actress, born in Ringgold
 O. Wayne Rollins (1912-1991), co-founder of Rollins, Inc.
 Cole Wilcox, professional baseball player, Heritage High School alumnus

References

External links

City of Ringgold official website
"Ringgold Gap; A Civil War Battle", at About North Georgia website

Cities in Georgia (U.S. state)
Cities in Catoosa County, Georgia
County seats in Georgia (U.S. state)
Chattanooga metropolitan area
Populated places established in 1846
1847 establishments in Georgia (U.S. state)
Chattanooga metropolitan area county seats